A flat-bottomed boat is a boat with a shallow draft, two-chined hull, which allows it to be used in shallow bodies of water, such as rivers, because it is less likely to ground.

The flat hull also makes the boat more stable in calm water, which is good for hunters and anglers. However this design becomes less stable in choppy water. This is because it causes the boat to travel on the water, instead of through it, as a boat with a rounded or V-shaped hull would.

Flat hulls are simple to construct, making them popular with boat-building hobbyists.

In Britain they came to popular notice during the planned French invasion of Britain in 1759, when a large-number of flat-bottomed boats were prepared by the French to ferry their invasion force across the channel and a number were destroyed during the British Raid on Le Havre. The flat-bottoms are mentioned in the song Heart of Oak written by David Garrick during 1759.

Types

Barge
Bateau
 Bull boat
 Car float
 Coracle
 Currach
Dory
Durham boat
Flatboat
Gondola
Jon boat
Keelboat
Landing Ship, Tank
Norfolk punt
Pirogue
Pontoon boat
Pram
Punt
Pünte
Quffah
Sandolo
Scow
Sharpie (boat)
Trow

See also
Horse-drawn boat
Pedalo
Pusher (boat)
Towpath

References

Boat types